Zhang-Zhung is an extinct Sino-Tibetan language that was spoken in what is now western Tibet. It is attested in a bilingual text called A Cavern of Treasures (mDzod phug) and several shorter texts.

A small number of documents preserved in Dunhuang contain an undeciphered language that has been called Old Zhangzhung, but the identification is controversial.

A Cavern of Treasures (mDzod phug)
A Cavern of Treasures is a terma uncovered by Shenchen Luga in the early eleventh century. Martin identifies the importance of  this scripture for studies of the Zhang-zhung language:

External relationships

Bradley (2002) says Zhangzhung "is now agreed" to have been a Kanauri or West Himalayish language. Guillaume Jacques (2009) rebuts earlier hypotheses that Zhangzhung might have originated in eastern (rather than western) Tibet by having determined it to be a non-Qiangic language.

Widmer (2014:53–56) classifies Zhangzhung within the eastern branch of West Himalayish, and lists the following cognates between Zhangzhung and Proto-West Himalayish.

Scripts
A number of scripts are recorded as being used for writing the Zhang-Zhung language:

 Marchen or Greater Mar script
 Marchung or Lesser Mar script
 Pungchen or Greater Pung script
 Pungchung or Lesser Pung script
 Drusha script

Old Zhangzhung 
F. W. Thomas suggested that three undeciphered Dunhuang manuscripts in a Tibetan script were written in an older form of the Zhang-zhung language. This identification has been accepted by Takeuchi Tsuguhito (武内紹人), who called the language "Old Zhangzhung" and added two further manuscripts.
Two of these manuscripts are in the Stein collection of the British Library (IOL Tib J 755 (Ch. Fragment 43) and Or.8212/188) and three in the Pelliot collection of the Bibliothèque Nationale (Pelliot tibétain 1247, 1251 and 1252).  In each case, the relevant text is written on the reverse side of a scroll containing an earlier Chinese Buddhist text.
The texts are written in a style of Tibetan script dating from the late 8th or early 9th centuries.
Takeuchi and Nishida claim to have partially deciphered the documents, which they believe to be separate medical texts.
However, David Snellgrove, and more recently Dan Martin, have rejected Thomas's identification of the language of these texts as a variant of Zhang-zhung.

See also
 Zhang Zhung
 Bön

References

Further reading
Martin, Dan (n.d.). "Comparing Treasuries: Mental states and other mdzod phug lists and passages with parallels in Abhidharma works of Vasubandhu and Asanga, or in Prajnaparamita Sutras: A progress report." University of Jerusalem.
David Bradley (2002) "The Subgrouping of Tibeto-Burman", in Chris Beckwith, Henk Blezer, eds., Medieval Tibeto-Burman Languages. Brill.
 
Haarh, Erik. The Zhang-zhung Language: A Grammar and Dictionary of the Unexplored Language of the Tibetan Bönpos. Universitetsforlaget i Aarhus og Munksgaard, 1968.
Hummel, Seigbert and Guido Vogliotti, ed. and trans. On Zhang-zhung. Dharamsala: Library of Tibetan Works and Archives, 2000.
Namgyal Nyima Dagkar. “Concise Analysis of Zhang Zhung Terms in the Documents of Dunhuang.” In Tibet, Past and Present: Tibetan Studies I, edited by Henk Blezer, Proceedings of the Ninth Seminar of the International Association for Tibetan Studies, Leiden 2000, vol. 1, pp. 429–439. Leiden: Brill, 2002.
Namgyal Nyima (Rnam rgyal nyi ma). Zhang-zhung – Tibetan – English Contextual Dictionary. Berlin, 2003. Description: This new dictionary of Zhangzhung terminology from the Bön tradition of Tibetan religion includes 3875 entries drawn from 468 sources. These entries include Tibetan and English definitions as well as the citation of passages in which they occur with full bibliographical information for these passages.

Extinct languages of Asia
Languages attested from the 7th century
Languages extinct in the 10th century
West Himalayish languages